Benacazón is a city located in the comarca of Aljarafe, in the province of Seville, southern Spain.

Main sights
Hermitage of  Castilleja de Talhara, built in the 14th century, one of the most important Mudéjar churches in the Aljarafe.
Hermitage of Gelo, also in Mudéjar style. It has a nave and two aisles, and is in brickwork construction.
Parish church of Santa Maria de las Nieves (17th century).

Festivals

During the patronal festival in honour of Nuestra Señora de las Nieves, on 5 August, the toro de fuego (literally, "fire bull") run through the streets of the city: a man dressed up as a bull, covered with sparklerson the back and horns, chases the people until it eventually explodes.

References

External links
Benacazón - Sistema de Información Multiterritorial de Andalucía

Municipalities of the Province of Seville